Westport Township may refer to the following townships in the United States:

 Westport Township, Dickinson County, Iowa
 Westport Township, Pope County, Minnesota